Raymond Copeland Rolling (September 8, 1886 – August 25, 1966) was a second baseman in Major League Baseball. He played for the St. Louis Cardinals in 1912.

References

External links

1886 births
1966 deaths
Major League Baseball second basemen
St. Louis Cardinals players
Baseball players from Saint Paul, Minnesota
Sedalia Goldbugs players
Webb City Goldbugs players
Poplar Bluff (minor league baseball) players
Galesburg Boosters players
Brinkley (minor league baseball) players
Waterloo Lulus players
Hannibal Cannibals players
Greenwood Chauffeurs players
Greenwood Scouts players
New Haven White Wings players
Winston-Salem Twins players
Shreveport Gassers players